Straight Jacket Memoirs is a 2006 EP by Jon Oliva's Pain. Distributed by AFM Records, it was the first release by the band for their new label. The release featured two new full songs from the then forthcoming album, Maniacal Renderings, and live renditions of two songs from the band's previous album, 'Tage Mahal. The other track featured on the release is an edited version of the song "The Evil Beside You".

Track listing

Personnel 
Jon Oliva – lead vocals, keyboards
Matt LaPorte – guitars
Shane French – guitars
Kevin Rothney – bass, backing vocals
John Zahner – keyboards
Christopher Kinder – drums

Jon Oliva's Pain albums
2006 EPs
AFM Records EPs